Meinhard Edwin Mayer (March 18, 1929 – December 11, 2011) was a Romanian–born American Professor Emeritus of Physics and Mathematics at the University of California, Irvine, which he joined in 1966.

Biography
He was born on March 18, 1929, in Cernăuți. He experienced both the Soviet occupation of Northern Bukovina and, as a Jew, deportation to the Transnistria Governorate. He received his Ph.D from the University of Bucharest in 1957, where he taught until 1961.

He then taught at Brandeis University and Indiana University before moving to the University of California, Irvine (UCI) in 1966, where he taught until his retirement. He also took sabbaticals to various institutes, including the Institut des Hautes Etudes Scientifiques and MIT.

He had a deep interest in music, and in Yiddish language and literature.

He died in Newport Beach, California, on December 11, 2011. He was survived by his wife Ruth, his children Elma Mayer and Niels Mayer, and his grandchildren Jonathan Mayer, Juniper Woodbury, and Moss Woodbury.

Research
His research interests ranged from geometric methods in gauge theory, to the application of wavelets in turbulence. He was an early contributor (1958) to the theory of vector-bosons (W and Z bosons) and electro-weak unification, which later became the Standard model, and an early advocate of the use of fiber bundles in gauge theory.

He was a co-author (with Gerald Jay Sussman and Jack Wisdom) of Structure and Interpretation of Classical Mechanics, MIT Press, Cambridge, MA, 2001

Notes

References
Lie Groupoids versus Principal Bundles in Gauge Theories, in Proceedings of the International Conference on Differential-Geometric Methods in Physics, L.-L. Chau and W. Nahm, Eds., Plenum Press, 1990.
From Poisson Groupoids to Quantum Groupoids, and Back, in Proceedings of the XIX International Conference on Differential-Geometric Methods in Physics, R. Cianci and U. Bruzzo, Eds. Rapallo, 1990; 12 pages, Springer Verlag, Heidelberg, 1991.
 Wavelet Transforms and Atmospheric Turbulence, with Carl A. Friehe and Lonnie H. Hudgins, Physical Review Letters, 71, 3279-3282 (November 15, 1993)

External links
 
Obituary in Physics Today
Web Page (somewhat obsolete)
Faculty Profile
Paul Celan Article
An article about the 1908 Yiddish Language Conference (Yiddish and English)
QuickTime version (with sound) of a talk On Yiddish and German Poets from Czernowitz at the 2008 La Jolla Yiddish Conference
Slides (without sound) of the talk On Yiddish and German Poets from Czernowitz at the 2008 La Jolla Yiddish Conference

American physicists
20th-century American mathematicians
21st-century American mathematicians
Romanian mathematicians
University of California, Irvine faculty
University of Bucharest alumni
American people of Romanian-Jewish descent
Romanian emigrants to the United States
Fellows of the American Physical Society
Survivors of World War II deportations to Transnistria
Deaths from cancer in California
Deaths from esophageal cancer
1929 births
2011 deaths